The 2020–21 Missouri Valley Conference men's basketball season began with practices in October 2020, followed by the start of the 2020–21 NCAA Division I men's basketball season in November. Conference play began in January 2021.

Preseason

Preseason poll
The preseason awards and coaches' poll was released by the league office on October 14, 2020.

Preseason All-Missouri Valley teams

Regular season

Conference matrix
This table summarizes the head-to-head results between teams in conference play.

Player of the week
Throughout the season, the Missouri Valley Conference named a player of the week and a newcomer of the week each Monday.

Postseason

Coaches
Source

Source

All-Conference Teams
Source

Source

Conference Tournament

References